Far Eastern economic region (
tr.: Dalnevostochny ekonomichesky rayon) is one of twelve economic regions of Russia.

Composition
Until 2018 it encompassed the same area as the Far Eastern Federal District, which then was enlarged by Buryatia Republic and Zabaykalsky Krai.

In 2019 the economic region was enlarged by Buryatia Republic and Zabaykalsky Krai too 

The federal subjects are:
Amur Oblast
Buryatia Republic
Chukotka Autonomous Okrug
Jewish Autonomous Oblast
Kamchatka Krai
Khabarovsk Krai
Magadan Oblast
Primorsky Krai
Sakha Republic
Sakhalin Oblast
Zabaykalsky Krai

Economy
This region accounted for 4 per cent of the national GRP in 2008. Bordering on the Pacific Ocean, the region has Komsomolsk-on-Amur, Khabarovsk, Yakutsk, and Vladivostok as its chief cities. Machinery is produced, and lumbering, fishing, hunting, and fur trapping are important. The Trans-Siberian Railroad follows the Amur and Ussuri Rivers and terminates at the port of Vladivostok.

References

Economic regions of Russia
Economy of the Russian Far East